Sterling Tucker (December 21, 1923 – July 14, 2019) was an American civil and political rights activist and politician in Washington, D.C. He was the first chair of the Council of the District of Columbia and was an unsuccessful candidate for mayor of the city in 1978.

Early life and education
Tucker was born on December 21, 1923, in Akron, Ohio. He was the fourth of eight children. His father was a workforce foreman for the municipal government.

In 1942, Tucker graduated from West High School. In 1946, he graduated from University of Akron with a Bachelor of Arts in sociology. In 1950, he earned a master’s degree in psychology from the same school. At college, he met his future wife, Alloyce Robinson.

While in college, Tucker bused tables at the Garden Grille in Akron. He noticed that despite Ohio’s public accommodations law, African Americans were routinely turned away. Tucker was fired shortly after insisting that he eat in the main dining room while patronizing the restaurant on his day off.

Career
After graduating, Tucker worked for the National Urban League, first in Canton, Ohio, and in New York City. In 1956, he joined its Washington D.C. office.

In 1959, Tucker was fined $500 after pleading no-contest to charges of filing fraudulent income tax returns by over-claiming allowable deductions. President Lyndon B. Johnson pardoned him in 1966.

As part of the Poor People's Campaign, along with Reverend Ralph Abernathy and Coretta Scott King, Tucker organized Solidarity Day, a 50,000 member protest in Washington D.C. on June 19, 1969.

From 1969 to 1974, he served as the vice-chair of the first appointed Council of the District of Columbia and in 1974, he was elected chairman of the council in the first election after District of Columbia home rule was established. He served for one term.

Tucker also served as chairman of the Washington Metropolitan Area Transit Authority. In 1977, he made a pitch to team owners to bring a Major League Baseball team to Washington, D.C.

In 1978, he ran unsuccessfully for mayor against the incumbent Walter Washington and at-large council member Marion Barry. Tucker lost the primary to Barry by 1,500 votes.

In January 1979, President Jimmy Carter nominated Tucker to be Assistant Secretary for the Office of Fair Housing and Equal Opportunity at the United States Department of Housing and Urban Development. He served until the end of Carter's term.

In 1981, he opened a consulting firm, Sterling Tucker and Associates.

In 1989 and 1990, he served as a director of the D.C. Drug Control Policy, working to develop strategies for combating drug usage in Washington D.C.

In 1990, Tucker was chairman of the American Diabetes Association.

Death
Tucker died on July 14, 2019 at the age of 95 in Washington, D.C. from congestive heart failure and kidney failure. His body lay in repose in the John A. Wilson Building on July 23.

References

1923 births
2019 deaths
African-American people in Washington, D.C., politics
Members of the Council of the District of Columbia
Politicians from Akron, Ohio
University of Akron alumni
United States Assistant Secretaries of Housing and Urban Development
Washington, D.C., Democrats
20th-century African-American people
21st-century African-American people